Statistics of the Scottish Football League in season 1950–51.

Scottish League Division A

Scottish League Division B

See also
1950–51 in Scottish football

 
Scottish Football League seasons